Worcestershire Cricket Board played in List A cricket matches between 1999 and 2003. This is a list of the players who appeared in those matches.

Kabir Ali (2000–2001): Kabir Ali
Kadeer Ali (1999–20020: Kadeer Ali
David Banks (2000–2001): DA Banks
Michael Barfoot (1999): MR Barfoot
Andrew Bryan (2001): AP Bryan
James Burgoyne (1999): J Burgoyne
Simon Cook (2002): SH Cook
Mark Dale (2001–2002): MAP Dale
Steven Davies (2002–2003): SM Davies
Scott Ellis (2001): SWK Ellis
Alan Gough (2001): AJ Gough
Abdul Hafeez (2001–2003): A Hafeez
Jamil Hassan (2002): SJ Hassan
Claude Henderson (2000–2001): CW Henderson
Greg Hill (2000–2003): GR Hill
Mark Hodgkiss (2001): MA Hodgkiss
Christopher Howell (1999–2002): CR Howell
Richard Illingworth (2002): RK Illingworth
Imran Jamshed (2002–2003): I Jamshed
Gurdeep Kandola (2001–2003): GS Kandola
Justin Kemp (2003): JM Kemp
Stuart Lampitt (2003): SR Lampitt
David Manning (1999–2003): D Manning
Tom Mees (1999): T Mees
James Meyer (2000): JD Meyer
David Middleton (2001): DB Middleton
Depesh Patel (1999): DB Patel
Kishor Patel (2001): K Patel
Christopher Pearce (2003): CJ Pearce
James Pipe (2000–2001): DJ Pipe
Michael Rindel (2001): MJR Rindel
Jason Robinson (1999): JM Robinson
Nathan Round (1999–2003): NW Round
Mark Scott (1999): MS Scott
James Tandy (2000–2001): JM Tandy
Kosie Venter (1999): JF Venter
Alan Warner (2000): AE Warner
Gary Williams (2000): GD Williams
Gareth Williams (2001–2003): GJ Williams
Jonathan Wright (1999–2001): JP Wright

References

Worcestershire Cricket Board
Wicket-keepers